Ararki is a village in Hanumangarh district of Rajasthan State, India. Ararki is 9 km away from Nohar Tahsil.

References

Villages in Hanumangarh district